Elijah Craig is a premium and super-premium brand of bourbon whiskey produced in Kentucky by Heaven Hill Distilleries. The brand is sold as a straight bourbon, typically in 750 mL glass bottles.

Elijah Craig whiskey is offered in both small batch and single barrel bottlings.  The small batch variation (94 U.S. proof, 47% ABV) is also available in glass 375 mL and 1.75 L bottles. The Barrel Select expression is only available in 200 mL bottles. The company is headquartered in Bardstown, Kentucky, and its distillery (called the Heaven Hill Bernheim distillery) is in Louisville, Kentucky.

Namesake
The bourbon brand is named in honor of Reverend Elijah Craig (1738/1743 – May 18, 1808), who was a Baptist preacher, educator, and entrepreneur in Fayette County, Virginia, which became Scott County, Kentucky, following Kentucky statehood in 1792. In approximately 1789, Craig founded a distillery there. The Heaven Hill company dubiously credits him with the invention of "true Kentucky Bourbon" by improving the locally made distillate from an un-aged corn liquor through barrel-aging in charred oak casks, "a process that gives the bourbon its reddish color and unique taste." The Heaven Hill company uses this claim, calling Elijah Craig "The Father of Bourbon" in its advertising of their product. Elijah Craig is most widely known by association with this brand of bourbon.

Variations
The Elijah Craig label is currently offered worldwide in four variations. A fifth expression, called Elijah Craig Barrel Select, is only available at the distillery gift shop.

Current

 Elijah Craig Small Batch (94 proof)
 Elijah Craig 12 Year Old Small Batch Barrel Proof (around 125–140 proof, varies with batch)
 Elijah Craig 18 Year Old Single Barrel (90 proof)
 Elijah Craig 23 Year Old Single Barrel (90 proof)
 Elijah Craig Barrel Select (125 proof)

Discontinued

 Elijah Craig 12 Year Old Small Batch
 Elijah Craig 20 Year Old Single Barrel (90 proof)
 Elijah Craig 21 Year Old Single Barrel (90 proof)
 Elijah Craig 22 Year Old Single Barrel (90 proof)

The 18, 20, 21, 22, and 23 year old Elijah Craig variants may be sold in a hard canister with a leather bag.

Elijah Craig Small Batch

The Small Batch bottling of Elijah Craig was originally released in 1986 with a 12 year age statement. In early 2016, Heaven Hill announced that it would drop the age statement from the Small Batch label and switch to a composite of 8- and 12-year-old bourbon to extend their stocks. The new labeling of Elijah Craig Small Batch debuted shortly thereafter without an age statement. The company also increased the maximum number of barrels dumped per batch for the Small Batch expression from 100 to 200 barrels.

On September 29, 2016, Heaven Hill announced a redesign of the Elijah Craig Small Batch and Small Batch Barrel Proof offerings.

The Elijah Craig Small Batch (94 proof, 47% ABV) offering is the only Elijah Craig release available for private barrel selection.

Elijah Craig Small Batch Barrel Proof 
Since 2013, there have been three releases of Elijah Craig Small Batch Barrel Proof annually for a total of 22 releases as of January 2020. Starting with release #13 and the redesign of the Elijah Craig Small Batch Barrel Proof and Small Batch labels, batch numbers were included on the Barrel Proof label to specify the batch release order, month, and year.

Elijah Craig Single Barrel 
A single barrel variant of Elijah Craig is currently available in 18- and 23-year old bottlings. Heaven Hill has offered a single barrel version of Elijah Craig carrying 20, 21, and 22 year old age statements as well.

In May 2012, it was announced that the Elijah Craig 18 Year Old Single Barrel bottling would be suspended due to limited barrel stocks near this age. Heaven Hill announced that several extra-aged releases would be released annually to augment the lack of an 18-year-old offering. Shortly thereafter, 1,300 bottles of Elijah Craig 20 Year Old Single Barrel were released. In 2013, Elijah Craig 21 Year Old Single Barrel replaced the 20 year old offering. and in 2014, Elijah Craig 23 Year Old Single Barrel replaced the 21 year old. This release continues to be offered annually. In 2015, Elijah Craig 18 Year Old Single Barrel was offered again and continues to be released annually as well.

Awards and reviews
In the San Francisco World Spirits Competition of 2010, the 18-year-old Elijah Craig Single Barrel Bourbon was awarded "Best Bourbon" and received a "Double Gold Medal" rating. In previous years, it had received a "Double Gold Medal" rating in 2008, a "Gold Medal" rating in 2004, and four "Silver" ratings in other years (2003, 2005, 2006, and 2007).

In 2011, Elijah Craig 20 Year Old Single Barrel (Barrel #3735) was named by Whisky Advocate magazine as "American Whiskey of the Year".

In 2017, Elijah Craig Barrel Proof B517 (release 14, 124.2 proof, 62.1% ABV) was named by Whisky Advocate as "Whisky of the Year". Reviewer Jeffery Lindenmuth described the whiskey as "delivering a massive mouthful of incredibly robust flavors that drape leathery oak over a gooey caramel core, sprinkled with baking spice, while candied nuts and tobacco leaf notes appear on a drying finish dusted with cocoa."

See also

 List of whisky brands

References

External links
Heaven Hill Distilleries official website
Elijah Craig bourbon official website

Bourbon whiskey
Bardstown, Kentucky
Economy of Louisville, Kentucky
American brands
Alcoholic drink brands